This article contains lists of achievements in major senior-level international indoor volleyball, beach volleyball and sitting volleyball tournaments according to first-place, second-place and third-place results obtained by teams representing different nations. The objective is not to create combined medal tables; the focus is on listing the best positions achieved by teams in major international tournaments, ranking the nations according to the most podiums accomplished by teams of these nations.

Results 
For the making of these lists, results from following major international tournaments were consulted:

 FIVB: Fédération Internationale de Volleyball
 IOC: International Olympic Committee
 IPC: International Paralympic Committee
 WPV: World ParaVolley

Medals for the demonstration events are NOT counted. Medals earned by athletes from defunct National Olympic Committees (NOCs) and National Paralympic Committees (NPCs) or historical teams are NOT merged with the results achieved by their immediate successor states. The International Olympic Committee (IOC) and International Paralympic Committee (IPC) do NOT combine medals of these nations or teams.

The conventions used on these lists are: M for Men's tournament, and W for Women's tournament.

The tables are pre-sorted by total number of first-place results, second-place results and third-place results, then most first-place results, second-place results, respectively. When equal ranks are given, nations are listed in alphabetical order.

Indoor volleyball, beach volleyball and sitting volleyball

Men and women 

*Defunct National Olympic Committees (NOCs) and National Paralympic Committees (NPCs) or historical teams are shown in italic.

Men 

*Defunct National Olympic Committees (NOCs) and National Paralympic Committees (NPCs) or historical teams are shown in italic.

Women 

*Defunct National Olympic Committees (NOCs) or historical teams are shown in italic.

Indoor volleyball and beach volleyball

Men and women 

*Defunct National Olympic Committees (NOCs) or historical teams are shown in italic.

Men 

*Defunct National Olympic Committees (NOCs) or historical teams are shown in italic.

Women 

*Defunct National Olympic Committees (NOCs) or historical teams are shown in italic.

Indoor volleyball

Men and women 

*Defunct National Olympic Committees (NOCs) or historical teams are shown in italic.

Men 

*Defunct National Olympic Committees (NOCs) or historical teams are shown in italic.

Women 

*Defunct National Olympic Committees (NOCs) or historical teams are shown in italic.

Beach volleyball

Men and women

Men

Women

Sitting volleyball

Men and women 

*Defunct National Paralympic Committees (NPCs) or historical teams are shown in italic.

Men 

*Defunct National Paralympic Committees (NPCs) or historical teams are shown in italic.

Women

See also 

 List of indoor volleyball world medalists
 FIVB World Rankings
 FIVB Beach Volleyball World Rankings
 Volleyball records and statistics
 Major achievements in Olympic team ball sports by nation
 List of major achievements in sports by nation

References

General 
Official results
 Indoor volleyball
 Major tournaments: FIVB 2017 Media Guide (pages 48–75) – Indoor Volleyball Records
 Beach volleyball
 Major tournaments: FIVB 2017 Media Guide (pages 76–103) – Beach Volleyball Records
 Sitting volleyball
 Paralympics tournament: 1980 1984 1988 1992 1996 2000 2004  2008 2012 2016 
 World Para Volleyball Championship: History

Specific

External links 
 Fédération Internationale de Volleyball (FIVB)
 World ParaVolley (WPV)

Volleyball
Achievements
Achievements